Mike Brown was a professional baseball outfielder who played in the Negro leagues in the 1900s and 1910s.

Brown made his professional debut in 1905 with the Brooklyn Royal Giants, and went on to play for several teams, finishing his career in 1914 with the Lincoln Stars.

References

External links
  and Seamheads

Place of birth missing
Place of death missing
Year of birth missing
Year of death missing
Brooklyn Royal Giants players
Cuban Giants players
Lincoln Stars (baseball) players
Philadelphia Giants players
Schenectady Mohawk Giants players
Baseball outfielders